The Heart of New York is a 1932 American pre-Code comedy film starring the vaudeville team of Smith & Dale and George Sidney. It was directed by Mervyn LeRoy and based on the Broadway play Mendel, Inc. by David Freedman.

Plot
The plumber Mendel Marantz, a passionate inventor, hasn't much luck and a family that doesn't understand him. He finally strikes it rich with a dishwashing machine he invented. He finds an investor, Gassenheim, and begins to make his way up in the world. But Mendel's troubles are not over; his family doesn't share his dream to become the landlord of the house where they live on New York's Lower East Side. They prefer to move uptown to Park Avenue and adapt to how rich people live.
Mendel's  ideas for the house are not forgotten. The men he once told how he wished to transform the building take on the work of renovating it, with every detail he planned. Neighbours and visitors come to see the house and the new, beautiful penthouse. His wife and his children are still in Park Avenue  and when Gassenheim stops paying royalties to Mrs. Marantz, she and the children come home, to find that Mendel is close to losing everything.

Cast
 Joe Smith as Sam Shtrudel
 Charles Dale as Bernard Schnaps
 George Sidney as Mendel Marantz
 Ruth Hall as Lillian Marantz
 Aline MacMahon as Bessie, the Neighbor
 Anna Appel as Mrs. Zelde Marantz
 Donald Cook as Milton
 Oscar Apfel as Otto Gassenheim
 Harold Waldridge as Jakie Marantz (as Harold Waldrige)
 Marion Byron as Mimi Marantz
 George MacFarlane as Mr. Marshall
 Ann Brody as Mrs. Nussbaum
 Charles Coleman as Mendel's Butler

Box office
According to Warner Bros. records, the film earned $198,000 in the U.S. and $42,000 elsewhere.

References

External links

 "Mendel, Inc.", film review in The New York Times by Mordaunt Hall, March 2, 1932

American comedy films
American black-and-white films
American films based on plays
Films directed by Mervyn LeRoy
Films set in New York City
Films shot in New York City
Warner Bros. films
1932 comedy films
1932 films
1930s English-language films
1930s American films